M156 usually refers to the Mercedes-Benz M156 engine.

M156 may also refer to:

 M-156 (Michigan highway)
 Maserati M156 platform
 M156 universal mount, used with U.S. helicopter armament subsystems
 M156 (Cape Town), a Metropolitan Route in Cape Town, South Africa
 German minesweeper M156, sunk in 1944 after an action by